Myingyan District is a district of the Mandalay Division in central Burma.

Townships
The district contains the following townships:

Myingyan Township
Taungtha Township
Natogyi Township
Nganzun Township

At one point, Myingyan District also included Kyaukpadaung Township, until it was annexed into Nyaung-U District (with Nyaung-U Township) in 2014.

Towns
Myingdan District includes the following towns:

Districts of Myanmar
Mandalay Region